The Tetrasporaceae are a family of green algae, specifically of the Chlamydomonadales.

Genera
, AlgaeBase accepted the following genera:
Apiocystis Nägeli – 4 species
Askenasyella Schmidle – 6 species
Chlorangiochaete Korshikov – 1 species
Chlorokremys Wujek & R.H.Thompson – 1 species
Fottiella Ettl – 2 species
Gemellicystis Teiling – 1 species
Octosporiella Kugrens – 1 species
Paulschulzia Skuja – 3 species
Phacomyxa Skuja – 2 species
Placosphaera P.A.Dangeard – 2 species
Polychaetochloris Pascher – 1 species
Porochloris Pascher – 3 species
Tetraspora Link ex Desvaux – 22 species

References

External links

Chlorophyceae families
Chlamydomonadales